Vesijako Strict Nature Reserve is located in the Päijänne Tavastia region of Finland. This small reserve, near Lake Vesijako with two outlets in different watersheds, is noted for its geological features.

External links
 Vesijako Strict Nature Reserve in the Map service of Finnish National Land Survey

Strict nature reserves of Finland
Geography of Päijät-Häme
Padasjoki